Jatki, Jadgali, and other related terms have sometimes been used to refer to one or another of the Indo-Aryan languages spoken in Balochistan and neighbouring parts of Sindh and Punjab. These terms have their origin in the association (real or perceived) between speakers of those languages and either the Jats or, more broadly, other settled agriculturalist communities.

Jatki was used in 19th-century British sources for what would later be called Saraiki, as well as for Khetrani. Jaṭkī is also attested in local use in Balochistan as a name for these two languages as well as for Sindhi. Jataki was used by 19th-century British writer Richard Francis Burton for a variety of the Saraiki language.
 Jakati is a possibly spurious name used in the Ethnologue encyclopedia for either a Romani variety of Ukraine, or for the Inku language of Afghanistan.
 Jaḍgālī is the common name for the Jadgali language spoken in Iranian Balochistan and western parts of Pakistani Balochistan. In eastern Balochistan, this term and the related Jagḍālī  have been attested among the Baloch as a name for Sindhi and Lahnda varieties, including Saraiki. Related to the above are Jagdālī, and Jaghdali, in use among the Balochi speakers of Dera Ghazi Khan District of southwestern Punjab for the Saraiki variety spoken there. The Arabic terms az-Zighālī and az-Zijālī refer to speakers of the Jadgali language in the diaspora in Oman and the United Arab Emirates.
 Jatki is a dialect of Punjabi spoken in the Pakistani districts of Jhang, Sargodha, Mandi Bahauddin, Bahawalnagar, Toba Tek Singh, Chiniot, Khushab, Sahiwal, Okara, Pakpattan, Vehari, and Khanewal in the area of 49,121 km². The population of the above-mentioned districts is 26,374,221  according to the 2017 census in which the Jatki language is local and in majority. It is an intermediate language between Punjabi and Saraiki. It is a combination of the Shahpuri dialect and the Jhangvi dialect. the glottolog codes for these dialects are: 
 shah1266
 jatk1238 
 jang1253
 dhan1272

These are not to be confused with Jatu, a variety of the Haryanvi language.

References

Bibliography 

Language naming